Keith Ball (born 26 October 1940) is an English former footballer. He was a short but agile goalkeeper who made 145 league and cup appearances for Port Vale and enjoyed three spells with Walsall. He also played non-league football for Worcester City, Stourport, Darlaston, Nuneaton Borough, and Kidderminster Harriers. He was a squad player as Walsall won back-to-back promotions in 1959–60 and 1960–61, and was an ever-present for Port Vale as they won promotion out of the Fourth Division in 1968–69.

Career
Ball began his career at hometown club Walsall, as the "Saddlers" posted a sixth-place finish in the Fourth Division in 1958–59. Bill Moore's side then went on to win the divisional title in 1959–60, before winning a second successive promotion with a second-place finish in the Third Division in 1960–61. The Fellows Park outfit then settled in the Second Division with a 14th-place finish in 1961–62. Having only featured in 11 league games, Ball was allowed to join Southern League side Worcester City. City finished one point above the relegation zone in the 1962–63 campaign, before rising to 13th place in 1963–64 and then third place in 1964–65, before dropping to eighth position in 1965–66. Ball returned to Walsall, now managed by Ray Shaw, to play 34 Third Division games in the 1966–67 and 1967–68 campaigns.

He was bought by Gordon Lee's Port Vale in November 1968 for 'a small fee', to replace the injured Stuart Sharratt. He was immediately the first choice keeper for the "Valiants" after being preferred ahead of Milija Aleksic. Ball played 38 matches in the 1968–69 season and played all 52 matches in the 1969–70 Fourth Division promotion winning campaign. He made 30 appearances in the 1970–71 season and 35 appearances in the 1971–72 season, as Sharrat battled to win back his first team place. Ball was given a free transfer in May 1972, as experienced Bolton Wanderers stopper Alan Boswell was signed to take over goalkeeping duties at Vale Park. He moved on to Stourport before making another return to Walsall. He played two Third Division games under the stewardship of John Smith in the 1972–73 season, before moving into non-league football with Darlaston, Nuneaton Borough and Kidderminster Harriers.

Career statistics
Source:

Honours
Walsall
Football League Fourth Division: 1959–60
Football League Third Division second-place promotion: 1960–61

Port Vale
Football League Fourth Division fourth-place promotion: 1968–69

References

1940 births
Living people
Sportspeople from Walsall
English footballers
Association football goalkeepers
Walsall F.C. players
Worcester City F.C. players
Port Vale F.C. players
Stourport Swifts F.C. players
Darlaston Town F.C. players
Nuneaton Borough F.C. players
Kidderminster Harriers F.C. players
English Football League players
Southern Football League players